HD 147513 (62 G. Scorpii) is a star in the southern constellation of Scorpius. It was first catalogued by Italian astronomer Piazzi in his star catalogue as "XVI 55". With an apparent magnitude of 5.38, according to the Bortle scale it is visible to the naked eye from suburban skies. Based upon stellar parallax measurements by the Hipparcos spacecraft, HD 147513 lies some 42 light years from the Sun.

Properties

This is a Sun-like main sequence star with a stellar classification of G1VH-04. It has about 11% greater mass than the Sun, and is considered young with an estimated age of 400 million years. As such, it has a similar luminosity to the Sun despite being more massive. Although the abundance of elements is similar to the Sun, it is a Barium star that is overabundant in elements produced through the s-process. HD 147513 is suspected of being a variable star.

HD 147513 is a member of the Ursa Major moving group that share a common proper motion through space. It has a nearby co-moving companion: a DA-class white dwarf located some 5,360 AU distant, where an AU is the average separation of the Earth from the Sun. At one time the pair may have been members of a multiple star system. The progenitor of the white dwarf may have been a closer companion, and while passing through the asymptotic giant branch stage of its evolution, could have transferred matter onto HD 147513 and contaminated this star's photosphere.

Planetary system
In 2002, the Geneva Extrasolar Planet Search Team announced the discovery of an extrasolar planet orbiting the star. Based upon the orbital elements, most of this gas giant's orbit lies within the habitable zone (HZ) of the host star; it only passes outside this region at apogee. As such, it is unlikely that a terrestrial planet could have a stable orbit within the HZ unless it moves in a synchronized fashion with the gas giant. Numerical simulations suggest that such a planet could orbit within the L4 or L5 Lagrangian points of the gas giant.

See also 
 List of extrasolar planets

References

External links
 

 
G-type main-sequence stars
Suspected variables
Barium stars
HD, 147513
Scorpii, 62
Durchmusterung objects
Gliese and GJ objects
147513
080337
6094
Planetary systems with one confirmed planet